Cyril Walter Horn (7 October 1904 – 7 February 1987) was an English speed skater and cyclist. He competed in the 500–5000 m events at the 1924 and 1928 Winter Olympics with the best result of 23rd place in the 5000 m in 1928.

Biography
Horn was born to a blacksmith in a family of six siblings. Among them two became national champions: Cyril in speed skating and cycling, and his younger brother Dennis in cycling. At the age of 12 Cyril started working with his father, making horseshoes for the British Army, and later, in the early 1920s took up skating and cycling. In 1944–45 he bought a small farm in Outwell.

Cyril was the British champion in track cycling at the British National Individual Sprint Championships in 1937.

References

1904 births
1987 deaths
English male speed skaters
Speed skaters at the 1924 Winter Olympics
Speed skaters at the 1928 Winter Olympics
Olympic speed skaters of Great Britain
Sportspeople from Norfolk
People from Outwell
People from Upwell